Mesves - Bulcy is a railway station in Mesves-sur-Loire, Bourgogne-Franche-Comté, France. The station is located on the Moret-Lyon railway. The station is served by TER (local) services operated by SNCF between Cosne-sur-Loire and Nevers.

References

Railway stations in Nièvre